An Insatiable High is the third studio album by jazz fusion guitarist Masayoshi Takanaka, released on Kitty Records in 1977. It has never been released in physical format outside of Japan. 

The album features performances from the American R&B and jazz group Tower of Power, and vocal performances from American session musician Jim Gilstrap. A YouTube upload of the album had nearly two million views before being taken down.

Track listing
Adapted from LP liner notes:

Personnel

Adapted from LP liner notes:

Masayoshi Takanaka – guitar, string arrangement (4), composer
Lee Ritenour – guitar
Abraham Laboriel – bass guitar (1, 4, 6)
Chuck Rainey – bass guitar (2, 3, 5, 7)
Patrice Rushen – keyboards (1–4, 6, 7)
Jun Fukamachi – keyboards (3, 5), string arrangement (2)
Harvey Mason – drums (1, 3–6)
Ed Greene – drums (2, 7)
Shuichi Murakami – drums (4)
Motoya Hamaguchi – percussion (1, 3–5)
Steve Forman – percussion (1, 3–6)
Paulinho da Costa – percussion (2, 3, 5, 7)
Elise Krentzel – lyrics (1)
Roy Alfred – lyrics (4)
Julia Tillman Waters – backup vocals (1, 4, 6)
Maxine Willard Waters – backup vocals (1, 4, 6)
Maxine Anderson – backup vocals (1, 4, 6)
Jim Gilstrap – backup vocals (4)
Katz Hoshi – string arrangement (7)

Tower of Power
Emilio Castillo – tenor saxophone
Lenny Pickett – tenor saxophone
Steve Kupka – baritone saxophone
Greg Adams – trumpet, horns arrangement (1, 4, 5)
Mic Gillette – trumpet

Additional personnel and production
Katsuya Yasumuro – executive producer
Tokio Shibata – production manager
Bob Stone – recording
Teruaki Kitagawa – recording, mixing
Isao Sakai – design
Masayoshi Sukita – photography
Hiroshi Tanaka – management
Naomi Niimura – coordinator
Olivia Page – coordinator

References

External links

1977 albums
Masayoshi Takanaka albums